The Global Business Review is a peer-reviewed academic journal covering all aspects of management.
Global Business Review is published by International Management Institute in association with SAGE Publications
. It publishes articles which are of a multi-disciplinary, interdisciplinary, and internationally significant nature. This is a refereed journal  with an emphasis on Asian and Indian perspectives. Papers are reviewed by eminent academicians and professionals from various places of the world.

Access 
The entire contents of Global Business Review are available in full-text, searchable electronic databases.

Abstracting and indexing 
Global Business Review is abstracted and indexed in:
 Australian Business Deans Council (ABDC)
 CABELLS Journalytics
 Chartered Association of Business Schools (ABS)
 DeepDyve
 Dutch-KB
 EBSCO
 Indian Citation Index (ICI)
 J-Gate
 OCLC
 Ohio
 Portico
 Pro-Quest-RSP
 ProQuest-Illustrata
 Research Papers in Economics (RePEc)
 SCOPUS
 UGC-CARE (GROUP II)
 Emerging Sources Citation Index (ESCI)

References

External links
 Global Business Review 
 SAGE:Global Business Review

SAGE Publishing academic journals
English-language journals
Business and management journals
Publications established in 2000